The 2019 American Ultimate Disc League season was the eighth season for the league. It began on April 5, 2019, and concluded on August 11, 2019, when the New York Empire defeated the Dallas Roughnecks to earn the team's first title. Ben Jagt of the Empire won his first league MVP award after the season. The season marked Steve Hall's first as league commissioner, and was the first with an all-star game for the league.

Offseason 
In early October 2018, AUDL franchise owners selected Steve Hall, a co-owner of the Atlanta Hustle, to be the new league commissioner for a three-year term. He succeeds previous commissioner Steve Gordon. Around the same time, the league announced tentative plans for a women's ultimate league to be started as early as 2020. Adding to the new endeavors, AUDL added an all-star game for the first time in league history and accordingly shortened the schedule from 14 to 12 regular-season games. 2019 marked the second year of the league's television agreement with Stadium.

Two teams folded over the offseason, the San Francisco FlameThrowers and the Nashville NightWatch. No new teams joined the league for the 2019 season.

Regular season 
Each team played twelve games, contested over fifteen weeks in the regular-season schedule.

Week 1

Week 2 

The Austin Sol beat Texas rival Dallas Roughnecks for the first time in franchise history, snapping a twelve-game skid.

Week 3

Week 4

Week 5

Week 6

Week 7

Week 8

Week 9

Week 10 
No regular season games were held in week 10; instead, the inaugural AUDL All-Star contest was held.

Week 11

Week 12

Week 13

Week 14 

Cameron Brock of the Indianapolis AlleyCats became the first player in AUDL history to score 500 career goals, a feat he accomplished in the Week 14 matchup against the Chicago Wildfire.

Week 15

Standings

East Division

Midwest Division

The Madison Radicals did not participate in the postseason for the first time in franchise history, having made playoff appearances from 2013 to 2018.

West Division

South Division

All-Star Game 
The inaugural AUDL All-Star game was held on June 8, 2019, at Breese Stevens Field in Madison, Wisconsin. The league opted not to go with conference all-star teams and instead utilized a draft format, with Rowan McDonnell of the DC Breeze and Kevin Petit-Scantling of the Madison Radicals serving as captains. It was regarded by those within the league as one of the highest-level games of Ultimate ever played. The game was televised live on Stadium as part of the network's deal with the league. Team KPS won 28 – 27 after being tied at the end of regulation and overtime, with Max Sheppard of the Pittsburgh Thunderbirds being named MVP. A 2020 edition of the game was later confirmed to be taking place in Washington, D. C.

Postseason

Divisional playoff

Divisional final

The Indianapolis AlleyCats advanced to their first Championship Weekend since the inaugural season of the AUDL in 2012.

Championship Weekend 8
Championship Weekend 8 took place at Foothill College in San Jose, California from August 10–11, 2019.

The New York Empire won their first title, and Beau Kittredge won his fifth title overall. New York joined the 2016 Dallas Roughnecks and 2013 Toronto Rush as the only AUDL teams in history to finish a season undefeated.

References 

American Ultimate Disc League
American Ultimate Disc League